Escueta is a surname. Notable people with the surname include:

Mark Escueta (born 1976), Filipino musician
Miguel Escueta (born 1984), Filipino male vocalist, singer, and performer
Philip Joper Escueta (born 1993), Filipino badminton player

Tagalog-language surnames